The Roman Catholic Diocese of Brno is a diocese located in the city of Brno in the ecclesiastical province of Olomouc in the Czech Republic.

History
 1296: A collegiate (latter the cathedral) chapter established in Brno
 1625: A collegiate chapter established in Mikulov
 1777, December 5: The Diocese established from a part of the Diocese of Olomouc
 1780s: As a consequence of the Edict on Idle Institutions (by Joseph II) some ancient monasteries and convents abolished
 1783: Territory (substantially) extended
 1807: A seminary established
 1909: The first diocesan synod was held
 1934: The second diocesan synod was held
 1938-1945: Substantial southern part of the diocese (under the rule of Nazi Germany) administered separately by vicar general in Mikulov
 1945-1946: German population expelled from the diocese
 1950: The seminary abolished due to the Communist rule
 1950-1968: Communists prevented Bishop Karel Skoupý from tenure of office
 1972-1990: Sede vacante due to the Communist rule
 1999: Administrative reorganisation: number of deaneries reduced from 37 to 20

Special churches
 Basilica of the Assumption (Bazilika Nanebevzetí Panny Marie) in Staré Brno
 Basilica of Our Lady of the Assumption and St. Nicholas in Žďár nad Sázavou
 St. Wenceslas Collegiate Church in Mikulov

Bishops of Brno
 Mathias Franz Chorinsky von Ledske (1777–1786)
 Johann Baptist Lachenbauer, OCr (1786–1799)
 Vinzenz Joseph Franz Sales von Schrattenbach (1800–1816)
 Wenzel Urban von Stuffler (1817–1831)
 Franz Anton Gindl (1831–1841)
 Anton Ernst von Schaffgotsche (1841–1870)
 Karl Nöttig (1870–1882)
 František Saleský Cardinal Bauer (1882–1904)
 Pavel Huyn  (1904–1916)
 Norbert Johann Klein, OT (1916–1926)
 Josef Kupka (1931–1941)
 Karel Skoupý (1946–1972)
 Vojtěch Cikrle (since 1990)

Saints connected with the diocese
 St. Peter and Paul, patron saints of the diocese
 St. Zdislava, born 1220s in Křižanov
 St. Clement Hofbauer, born 1751 in Tasovice
 Blessed Maria Restituta, born 1894 in Husovice (now part of Brno)
 Jan Bula, a Catholic priest executed by the Communist regime in 1952. The Diocese has been processing his beatification since 2004.

See also
Roman Catholicism in the Czech Republic

References

 Katalog brněnské diecéze. Neproměnná část. Brno 2007.
 GCatholic.org
 Catholic Hierarchy
 Diocese website

Roman Catholic dioceses in the Czech Republic
Religious organizations established in 1777
Dioceses established in the 18th century
Brno
1777 establishments in the Holy Roman Empire
1777 establishments in the Habsburg monarchy
18th-century establishments in Bohemia